A dress (also known as a frock or a gown) is a garment traditionally worn by women or girls consisting of a skirt with an attached bodice (or a matching bodice giving the effect of a one-piece garment). It consists of a top piece that covers the torso and hangs down over the legs. A dress can be any one-piece garment containing a skirt of any length, and can be formal or casual.

A dress can have sleeves, straps, or be held up with elastic around the chest, leaving the shoulders bare. Dresses also vary in color.

The hemlines of dresses vary depending on modesty, weather, fashion or the personal taste of the wearer.

Overview 
Dresses are outer garments made up of a bodice and a skirt and can be made in one or more pieces. Dresses are generally suitable for both formal wear and casual wear in the West for women and girls.

Historically, dresses could also include other items of clothing such as corsets, kirtles, partlets, petticoats, smocks, and stomachers.

History

11th century 
In the 11th century, women in Europe wore dresses that were similar to men's tunics and were loose, with a hemline reaching to below the knees or lower. By the end of the century, these dresses featured a tighter fit on the arms and women's upper bodies. Dresses were made snug by featuring slits on the sides of the dress that were pulled tight in order to fit a woman's figure.

16th century 
Starting in the 1550s, middle- and upper-class women in Europe wore dresses which included a smock, stays, kirtle, gown, forepart, sleeves, ruff and a partlet. Undergarments were not worn underneath. In England, Queen Elizabeth dictated what kinds of dresses women were allowed to wear. French women were inspired by Spanish-style bodices and also wore ruffs. French dresses were known as marlottes. In Italy, dresses were known as ropa and semarra. Dresses in the 16th century also displayed surface decoration such as embroidery, with blackwork being especially popular.

Women's dresses in Russia during both the 16th and 17th centuries identified a woman's place in society or their family.

17th century 
Holland, as a center of textile production, was a particularly noted area of innovation in dress fashion during the 17th Century. In Spain and Portugal, women wore stomachers  while in England and France, dresses became more "naturally" shaped. Lace and slashing were popular decorations. Skirts were full, with regular folds and the overskirt allowed the display of an underskirt of contrasting fabric. Necklines became lower as well. Embroidery that reflected scientific discoveries, such as newly discovered animals and plants were popular. In the British Colonies, multi-piece dresses were also popular, though less luxurious. Wealthy women living in the Spanish or Dutch colonies in the Americas copied the fashions that were popular from their homelands.

The three-piece dress, which had a bodice, petticoat and gown, was popular until the last 25 years of the century, in which the mantua, or a one-piece gown, became more popular. Corsets became more important in dresses by the 1680s.

Working women, and women in slavery in the Americas, used simple patterns to create shifts, wool or linen petticoats and gowns and cotton dresses. The bottoms of the skirts could be tucked into the waistband when a woman was near a cooking or heating fire.

18th century 

Large, triangular silhouettes were favored during the 18th century, skirts were wide and supported by hoop underskirts. One-piece gowns remained popular until the middle of the century. During the 1760s in France, hoop petticoats were reduced in size. Lighter colors and lighter fabrics were also favored. In Colonial America, women most often wore a gown and petticoat, in which the skirt of the gown opened to reveal the petticoat underneath. Women also had riding habits which consisted of the petticoat, jacket and a waistcoat.

French fashion regarding dresses became very fast-changing during the later part of the 18th century. Throughout this period, the length of fashionable dresses varied only slightly, between ankle-length and floor-sweeping. Between 1740 and 1770, the robe à la française was very popular with upper-class women. In France, the Empire style became popular after the French Revolution. This more simple style was also favored by Josephine Bonaparte, wife of Napoleon. Other popular styles during the revolution included tunic dresses and the negligée à la patriot, which featured the red, white and blue colors of the flag.

19th century

Women's dresses in the 19th century began to be classified by the time of day or purpose of the dress. High-waisted dresses were popular until around 1830.

Early nineteenth century dresses in Russia were influenced by Classicism and were made of thin fabrics, with some semi-transparent. Elizabeth Vigée Le Brun wore these types of dresses with a short skirt (reaching to her ankles) when she lived in Russia between 1785 and 1801 and many Russian women copied her style. By the 1840s, Russian women were turning to what was in fashion in Europe.

Europeans styles in dresses increased dramatically to the hoopskirt and crinoline-supported styles of the 1860s, then fullness was draped and drawn to the back. Dresses had a "day" bodice with a high neckline and long sleeves, and an "evening" bodice with a low neckline (decollete) and very short sleeves. In Russia, metal hoopskirts were known as "malakhovs." Skirts of the 1860s were heavily decorated.

To sleep, women in the American West wore floor-length dresses of white cotton with high collars displaying decoration. Various Native American people, such as the Navajo and the Mescalero Apache began to adapt the designs of their dresses to look more like the European Americans they came in contact with. Navajo women further adapted the European designs, incorporating their own sense of beauty, "creating hózhó."

Paper sewing patterns for women to sew their own dresses started to be readily available in the 1860s, when the Butterick Publishing Company began to promote them. These patterns were graded by size, which was a new innovation.

The Victorian era's dresses were tight-fitting and decorated with pleats, rouching and frills. Women in the United States who were involved in dress reform in the 1850s found themselves the center of attention, both positive and negative. By 1881, the Rational Dress Society had formed in reaction to the restrictive dress of the era.

20th century

In the early twentieth century, the look popularized by the Gibson Girl was fashionable. The upper part of women's dresses in the Edwardian era included a "pigeon breast" look that gave way to a corseted waist and an s-shaped silhouette. Women called their dresses "waists" if one-piece, or "shirtwaists," if it consisted of a skirt and a blouse. The bodice of the dresses had a boned lining. Informally, wealthy women wore tea gowns at home. These garments were looser, though not as loose as a "wrapper," and made of expensive fabric and laces.

By 1910, the Edwardian look was replaced with a straighter silhouette. French designer, Paul Poiret, had a huge impact on the look of the time. Designs developed by Poiret were available in both boutiques and also in department stores. Popular dresses of the time were one-piece and included lingerie dresses which could be layered. At around the same time, in the United States, the American Ladies Tailors' Association developed a dress called the suffragette suit, which was practical for women to work and move around in. Another innovation of the 1910s was the ready availability of factory-made clothing.

Waistlines started out high and by 1915 were below the natural waist. By 1920, waistlines were at hip-level. Between 1910 and 1920 necklines were lower and dresses could be short-sleeved or sleeveless. Women who worked during World War I preferred shorter dresses, which eventually became the dominant style overall. In addition to the shorter dresses, waistlines were looser and the dominant colors were black, white and gray.

By 1920, the "new woman" was a trend that saw lighter fabrics and dresses that were easier to put on. Younger women were also setting the trends that older women started to follow. The dresses of the 1920s could be pulled over the head, were short and straight. It was acceptable to wear sleeveless dresses during the day. Flapper dresses were popular until end of the decade.

During World War II, dresses were slimmer and inspired by military uniforms. After WWII, the New Look, promoted by Christian Dior was very influential on fashion and the look of women's dresses for about a decade.

Since the 1970s, no one dress type or length has dominated fashion for long, with short and ankle-length styles often appearing side by side in fashion magazines and catalogs.

Use

In most varieties of formal dress codes in Western cultures, a dress of an appropriate style is mandatory for women. They are also very popular for special occasions such as proms or weddings. For such occasions they, together with blouse and skirt, remain the de facto standard attire for many girls and women.

Formal dress
In western countries, a "formal" or white tie dress code typically means tailcoats for men and full-length evening dresses with opera-length gloves for women. A most formal dress for women are full-length ball or evening gowns with evening gloves. Some white tie functions also request that the women wear long gloves past the elbow.

Basic dress
A basic dress is a usually dark-colored dress of simple design which can be worn with various accessories to suit different occasions. Different kinds of jewelry, belts, scarves, and jackets can be worn with the basic dress to dress up or down. A little black dress is an example of a basic dress.

Bodycon dress

A bodycon dress is a tight figure-hugging dress, often made from stretchy material. The name derives from "body confidence" or, originally, "body conscious", transformed into Japanese in the 1980s as "bodikon".

Party dress

A party dress is a dress worn especially for a party.  Different types of party such as children's party, cocktail party, garden party and costume party would tend to require different styles of dress.  One classic style of party dress for women in modern society is the little black dress.

Types of dresses

Time period

Lengths

See also

 History of Western fashion
China poblana
 Granny dress
 Jumper dress
 Lingerie dress
 List of individual dresses
 Mantua
 Sack-back gown (also known as robe à la française)
 Squaw dress

References

Citations

Sources 

Brockmamn, Helen L.: The Theory of Fashion Design, Wiley, 1965.

Stoykov, Lubomir (2016). Theoretical problems of fashion, Sofia: National Academy of Art. 
Tozer, Jane, and Sarah Levitt: Fabric of Society: A Century of People and Their Clothes 1770–1870, Laura Ashley Ltd., 1983;

External links

 
History of clothing
Women's clothing